The Taungyo ( Tauñyoù lumyoù) are a sub-ethnic group of the Bamar people living primarily in Shan State and centered on Pindaya.

Language
They speak Taung-yo (တောင်ရိုးစကား Tauñyoùs̱áḵà), a Tavoyan dialect of the Burmese language.

A sample of Taungyo dialect vocabulary include the following:
red - anak (အနီ)
high - amrang
eye - myak-sai
light - lang

References

Ethnic groups in Myanmar
Bamar people